Hamburg Middle School may refer to:
 Hamburg Middle School, of the Hamburg Community School District, Hamburg, Iowa
 Hamburg Middle School or Hamburg Central Middle School, of the Hamburg Central School District, Hamburg, New York